Helal Khan is a Bangladeshi film actor and producer. His debut film was Priyo Tumi (1995). In his career, he has acted over 50 films. Couple of times Khan received National Film Awards in the year 2002 and 2003.

Personal life
He is a supporter of Bangladesh Nationalist Party. He shows his interest to participate in 2018 national election from Sylhet-6 seat.

Filmography
 Priyo Tumi
 Bazigor
 Sagarika (1998)
 Asha Amar Asha (1999)
 Kukkhato Khuni (2000) - Badol
 Bhoyongkor Sontrasi (2001)
 Hason Raza
 Juari (2003) - Raja
 Ora Shahoshi (2003)
 Momtaz  (2005)
 Dhrubotara (2006)
 Guru Bhai (2009)
 Nakful
 Aposhhin

Awards and achievements

References

External links
 

Living people
Bangladeshi male film actors
Best Performance in a Negative Role National Film Award (Bangladesh) winners
1969 births
People from Beanibazar Upazila